Thomas Southwell  (fl. 1420s - 1440s) was a Canon of Windsor from 1428 to 1431.

Career

He was appointed:
Vicar of Ruislip 1437 - 1440
Rector of St Stephen's, Walbrook 1428 - 1440
Prebendary of the 10th stall in St Stephen’s Westminster 1431 - 1441

He was appointed to the eighth stall in St George's Chapel, Windsor Castle in 1428 and held the canonry until 1431.

Notes 

Canons of Windsor